Odonthalitus is a genus of moths belonging to the family Tortricidae.

Species
Odonthalitus bisetanus Brown, 2000
Odonthalitus conservanus Brown, 2000
Odonthalitus fuscomaculatus Brown, 2000
Odonthalitus improprius Brown, 2000
Odonthalitus lacticus Razowski, 1991
Odonthalitus orinoma (Walsingham, 1914)
Odonthalitus poas Brown, 2000
Odonthalitus regilla (Walsingham, 1914)
Odonthalitus viridimontis Brown, 2000

See also
List of Tortricidae genera

References

 , 2000: Revision of Lobogenesis Razowski and Odonthalitus Razowski (lepidoptera: Tortricidae: Tortricinae), with comments on their monophyly. Proceedings of the Entomological Society of Washington 102 (1): 21–49.
 , 2005: World catalogue of insects volume 5 Tortricidae.
  1991: SHILAP revista de lepidopterologia 18: 208

External links
tortricidae.com

Euliini
Tortricidae genera